Raquel or Racquel is a variation of the given name Rachel. Notable people with the name include:

Raquel
Raquel (wrestler), Brazilian professional wrestler
Raquel Alessi (born 1983), American former actress and model 
Raquel Naa Ayorkor Ammah (born 1987), Ghanaian singer, composer and actress
Raquel Atawo (born 1982), American tennis player
Raquel Barros (1919–2014), Chilean folklorist
Raquel Bitton, French singer, actress and playwright
Raquel Bollo (born 1975), Spanish television personality business woman and model
Raquel Cabezón, Spanish football midfielder
Raquel Calderón (born 1991), Chilean actress, singer and lawyer
Raquel Carriedo-Tomás (born 1971), Spanish singer
Raquel Cassidy (born 1968), English actress
Raquel Cepeda, American journalist
Raquel Chalfi, Israeli poet
Raquel Dodge (born 1961), Brazilian politician
Raquel Diaz, Mexican-American professional wrestler, manager, model, and singer
Raquel Fernandes, Brazilian footballer, born 1991
Raquel Freire (born 1973), Portuguese film director
Raquel Garza (born 1967), Mexican actress and comedian
Raquel González (athlete) (born 1989), Spanish athlete
Raquel Guerra (born 1985), Portuguese singer and actress
Raquel Gutiérrez, Mexican militant intellectual
Raquel Justice (born 2004), American actress and daughter of David Justice
Raquel Kochhann (born 1992), Brazilian rugby sevens player
Raquel Lee (born 1986), American actress
Raquel Liberman (1900–1935), Polish-Jewish immigrant to Argentina
Raquel del Rosario Macías (born 1982), Spanish singer
Raquel Morell (born 1959), Mexican actress
Raquel Olmedo, Mexican actress and singer
Raquel Pa'aluhi (born 1990), American mixed martial artist
Raquel Paiewonsky (born 1969), artist from the Dominican Republic
Raquel Pankowsky (1952–2022), Mexican film and television actress
Raquel Pélissier (born 1991), Haitian model
Raquel Pennington (born 1988), American mixed martial artist 
Raquel Pierotti (born 1952), Uruguayan mezzo-soprano opera singer
Raquel Martínez Rabanal (born 1979), Spanish journalist 
Raquel Rolnik (born 1956), Brazilian architect and urban planner
Raquel Sánchez Silva (born 1973), Spanish television journalist
Raquel Silva (born 1978), Brazilian volleyball player
Raquel Sofía, Puerto Rican singer-songwriter
Raquel de Souza Noronha, Brazilian footballer, born 1978
Raquel Tavares (born 1985), Portuguese singer
Raquel Vizcaíno (born 1967), Spanish handball player
Raquel Welch (1940–2023), American actress (born Jo Raquel Tejada)
Raquel Willis, African American writer, editor, and transgender rights activist
Raquel Yánez (born 1986), Venezuelan actress and model
Raquel Zimmermann (born 1983), Brazilian model

Racquel 
Racquel Darrian (born 1968), birth name Kelly Jackson, American former pornographic actress
Racquel Nugent (born 1968), Australian athlete with disability
Racquel Sheath (born 1994), New Zealand track cyclist

Fictional characters
Raquel Alucard, a minor character in the BlazBlue video game series
Raquel Turner, in the British sitcom Only Fools and Horses
Raquel Fein, in the Amazon series Transparent
Raquel "Rocky" Blue, a main character in Shake It Up
Raquel Wolstenhulme, in the British soap Coronation Street
 Raquel D'Coasta, in the Indian film Vikrant Rona

Portuguese feminine given names
Spanish feminine given names